The Grotta delle Felci (Italian for "Fern Grotto") is a cave located on the island of Capri, in Campania, Italy.

The cave housed Neolithic men; 549 archaeological findings and fossils have been found internally.

Caves of Campania
Capri, Campania